1,2-Bis(dicyanomethylene)squarate is a divalent anion with chemical formula  or ((N≡C−)C=)(CO).  It is one of the pseudo-oxocarbon anions, as it can be described as a derivative of the squarate oxocarbon anion  through the replacement of two adjacent oxygen atoms by dicyanomethylene groups =C(−C≡N).

The anion can be obtained by reacting squaric acid with n-butanol to obtain the diester 1,2-dibutyl squarate (an oily orange liquid) and treating the latter with metallic sodium and malononitrile (N≡C−)CH to give the  trihydrated disodium salt 2Na··3HO, a yellow water-soluble solid.  The hydrated salt loses the water below 100 °C, but the resulting anhydrous salt is stable up to 400 °C. Reaction of the sodium salt with the  chlorides of other cations in ethanol affords the following salts:
 dipotassium 2K·, anhydrous, yellow, stable to 300 °C
 dirubidium 2Rb·, anhydrous, brown, stable to 300 °C
 magnesium sodium chloride, Mg·Na·Cl··HO, dark yellow, dehydrates at 60–106 °C, stable to 461 °C
 calcium disodium, 2Na·Ca·2·9HO, yellow, dehydrates at 50–90 °C, stable to 178 °C
 barium, Ba··2HO, yellow, dehydrates at 87 °C, stable to 337 °C
 tetra-n-butylammonium, 2(CH)N··HO, yellow, dehydrates at 145 °C, stable to 323 °C

Nuclear magnetic resonance shows that the aromatic character of the squarate core is retained.

See also
Croconate violet
Croconate blue
1,3-Bis(dicyanomethylene)squarate

References

Oxyanions
Cyclobutenes